German submarine U-1162 was a Type VIIC U-boat of Nazi Germany's Kriegsmarine during World War II.

She was ordered on 25 August 1941, and was laid down on 14 November 1942 at Danziger Werft AG, Danzig, as yard number 134. She was launched on 29 May 1943 and commissioned under the command of Oberleutnant zur See Dietrich Sachse on 15 September 1943.

Design
German Type VIIC submarines were preceded by the shorter Type VIIB submarines. U-1162 had a displacement of  when at the surface and  while submerged. She had two shafts and two  propellers.

U-1162 was fitted with five  torpedo tubes (four fitted at the bow and one at the stern), fourteen torpedoes or 26 TMA mines, one  SK C/35 naval gun, (220 rounds), one  Flak M42 and two twin  C/30 anti-aircraft guns. The boat had a complement of between 44 — 52 men.

Service history
Originally handed over to Italy with the intention to rename her S 10 in exchange for transport submarines. However, with Italy's surrender on 8 September 1943 the Kriegsmarine took the boat back over on 10 September 1943 at Danzig and commissioned her on 15 September 1943 as U-1162.

U-1162 was scuttled near Gelting in Gelting Bay on 5 May 1945, as part of Operation Regenbogen. Her wreck was raised and broken up.

References

Bibliography

External links

German Type VIIC submarines
U-boats commissioned in 1943
World War II submarines of Germany
Ships built in Danzig
1943 ships
Operation Regenbogen (U-boat)
Maritime incidents in May 1945